The Sydney Leadership program is an initiative of the Benevolent Society, and was started in 1999, with the aim of creating a network of committed individuals working together to bring about social change. It is based in Sydney, New South Wales, Australia.

Overview

Each year about 50 individuals from all walks of society, many working at the cutting edge of their communities, join the Sydney Leadership Program. They then embark on a year of intensive courses and activities, which aim to provide participants with
 more in-depth knowledge of a range of social issues,
 clarity of values and purpose,
 greater skills and confidence to act and increased resilience,
 greater ability to partner and collaborate successfully,
 a broader network across corporate, community and government sectors,
 capacity to exercise leadership in challenging environments.

At the end of the year, participants join the Sydney Leadership Alumni Network. Together with alumni from the partner Rural, Community and Youth Leadership programs they form the Social Leadership Network, whose 300+ members form a network of committed individuals extending through key positions in society.

In 2009 the program cost $14,800 per participant.

Achievements
Projects initiated by graduates of the Sydney Leadership Program include:
 Cultural/sports event for young refugees
 New humanities learning programs in prisons
 Rural business development in remote regions
 Teaching employable skills to disadvantaged youth
 Literacy in Prisons program
 Indigenous Leadership Programs
 Rural community futures - Moree 2020
 Community safety in Armidale
 Community Service Volunteer program in Lightning Ridge
 Youth unemployment in Wollongong
 Women on Boards
 Establishing a youth council in Leichhardt
 Bridging Generations in Penrith
 Uniting Christian & Muslim youth in western Sydney
 Building public housing estate networks
 Domestic violence – building family support networks
 Rural education in North West NSW

Impact on community leaders
Sydney Leadership has a high profile, and has been addressed by many prominent leaders such as the former Prime Minister, John Howard . For example,

 Marie Bashir, Governor of New South Wales, said that Sydney Leadership has an enviable reputation for innovative approaches in addressing critical social issues.
 Clover Moore, Lord Mayor of Sydney, said Sydney Leadership makes an important contribution to the life of Sydney, working at many levels and across sectors of difficult social issues that lie beneath the surface of any large city.
 Bob Carr, as Premier of New South Wales, said We need leaders who have the ability to share information and ideas, to build strong and effective networks, and to engage the community. Sydney Leadership provides an ideal forum for such individuals to broaden their horizons and challenge accepted wisdom.

References

 Challenge yourself, change your world : Sydney Leadership 2007. publ: Benevolent Society, Sydney, NSW. State Library of NSW (NSL) M Q303.34/ 10
 Hampshire, A., & Healy, K., 2000, "Social Capital in Practice", in "Family Futures : Issues in Research and Policy, 7th Australian Institute of Family Studies Conference, Sydney, 24–26 July 2000" 
 Howard, J.W., 2001, "Howard Speaks About Benevolence" (the text of a speech given by Prime Minister John Howard on the Benevolent Society and Sydney Leadership).

External links
 The Sydney Leadership home page
 The Social Leadership Network home page
 The Benevolent Society home page
 The Community Leadership members page

Charities based in Australia
Non-profit organisations based in New South Wales